Bison schoetensacki, commonly as the Pleistocene woodland bison or Pleistocene wood bison, was a species of bison that lived until from the Early Pleistocene to at least the early Middle Pleistocene from western Europe to southern Siberia. Its presence in the Late Pleistocene is debated.

Description 
B. schoetensacki was generally similar to extant European bison in shape although there could have been morphological variations among European bisons during late Early Pleistocene and Early Holocene.

In comparison to B. priscus, B. schoetensacki was either smaller or similar in size but with slenderer leg bones and metapodials, and had shorter and differently shaped horns.

Diet 
Despite its common name, B. schoetensacki was probably not a mix-feeder, like the extant American wood bison. Instead, dental mesowear of the species shows similar pattern to that of extant European bison, a grazer.

Paleobiology 
Fossils have been obtained from Czech Republic, England, France, Germany, Greece, Italy, Moldova, Russia, Spain, and mass excavations from the Paleolithic site of Isernia in Italy, dating back to around 700,000 years ago, indicate B. schoetensacki was the most heavily targeted animal by human hunters, as European bison likely didn't inhabit the Italian and Iberian Peninsulas.

Ranges of B. schoetensacki and steppe bison presumably overlapped for some extents.

Genetics 
A 2017 study which attributed Late Pleistocene European remains to B. schoetensacki found it to belong to a mitochondrial clade which is the sister group to modern wisent, and proposed the species as a whole is likely ancestral to modern wisent. However, other studies have disputed this attribution, restricting B. schoetensacki to Early and Middle Pleistocene remains.

References 

Bison
Prehistoric mammals of Europe
Fossil taxa described in 1910
Prehistoric bovids
Pleistocene extinctions